Kurt Sinette (born May 9, 1974) is a retired male boxer from Trinidad and Tobago, who won the bronze medal in the men's light middleweight (– 71 kg) category at the 1995 Pan American Games in Mar del Plata. He also came in 17th in the 1996 Summer Olympics in Atlanta.

References

Profile

1974 births
Living people
Light-middleweight boxers
Trinidad and Tobago male boxers
Boxers at the 1994 Commonwealth Games
Boxers at the 1995 Pan American Games
Boxers at the 1996 Summer Olympics
Boxers at the 1999 Pan American Games
Olympic boxers of Trinidad and Tobago
Commonwealth Games competitors for Trinidad and Tobago
Pan American Games bronze medalists for Trinidad and Tobago
Pan American Games medalists in boxing
Competitors at the 1998 Central American and Caribbean Games
Central American and Caribbean Games bronze medalists for Trinidad and Tobago
Central American and Caribbean Games medalists in boxing
Medalists at the 1995 Pan American Games